A strudel is a type of layered pastry with a filling that is usually sweet, but savoury fillings are also common. It became popular in the 18th century throughout the Habsburg Empire. Strudel is part of Austrian cuisine but is also common in other Central European cuisines. In Italy it is recognized as a traditional agri-food product (PAT) of South Tyrol.

The oldest strudel recipes (a Millirahmstrudel and a turnip strudel) are from 1696, in a handwritten cookbook at the Wienbibliothek im Rathaus (formerly Wiener Stadtbibliothek). The pastry descends from similar Near Eastern pastries (see baklava and Turkish cuisine).

Etymology
Strudel is an English loanword from German. The word derives from the German word Strudel, which in Middle High German literally means "whirlpool" or "eddy".

Pastry

The best-known strudels are apple strudel (Apfelstrudel in German) and Topfenstrudel (with sweet soft quark cheese, in Austrian German Topfen), followed by the Millirahmstrudel (milk-cream strudel, Milchrahmstrudel). Other strudel types include sour cherry (Weichselstrudel), sweet cherry, nut filled (Nussstrudel), apricot strudel, plum strudel, poppy seed strudel (Mohnstrudel), rhubarb strudel and raisin strudel. There are also savoury strudels incorporating spinach, cabbage, potato, pumpkin, and sauerkraut, and versions containing meat fillings like the Lungenstrudel or Fleischstrudel.

Traditional strudel pastry differs from puff pastry in that it is very elastic. It is made from flour with a high gluten content, water, oil and salt, with no sugar added. The dough is worked vigorously, rested, and then rolled out and stretched by hand very thinly with the help of a clean linen tea towel or kitchen paper. There are numerous techniques for manually pulling strudel dough. One method is to roll the dough thin before laying it over the back of the hands and drawing it thin by pulling the hands apart from one another. Purists say that it should be so thin that you can read a newspaper through it. A legend has it that the Austrian Emperor's perfectionist cook decreed that it should be possible to read a love letter through it. The thin dough is laid out on a tea towel, and the filling is spread on it. The dough with the filling on top is rolled up carefully with the help of the tea towel and baked in the oven.

Apples
Regional apple varieties prevail with choice based on firm to semi-firm texture once baked. Tasting notes are acidic with apple flavor. Varieties include Belle de Boskoop, Stayman Winesap, Gravenstein, Newtown Pippin, Bramley's Seedling, Karmijn de SonNnaville, Zabergau Reinette, Yellow Transparent, Calville Blanc, Granny Smith, Glockenapfel, Jonagold, Jonathan, Northern Spy, and Rhode Island Greening.

Savoury cabbage
Strudel (in Yiddish, שטרודל, pron. shtrudl) in general is also associated with Ashkenazi Jewish cuisine, particularly of German, Swiss, and Austrian Ashkenazi Jews. Apple and raisin filling is popular, but cabbage has historically also been used as a filling for a savoury strudel. The cabbage is braised or caramelized with sliced onions and caraway seeds, sometimes with added sugar. Recipes may include chopped walnuts. Cabbage strudel (káposztás rétes in Hungarian) is especially associated with the cuisine of Hungarian Jews.

The 19th-century American writer Alice Lee Moqué recorded an encounter with savoury strudel, ordered mistakenly as a dessert, in her account of her travels through Dalmatia (modern-day Croatia), at the Hotel Petka in Gravosa (Gruz). Assuming "Sprudel" was a type of "German sweetcake", Moqué's travel partner carelessly ordered a "Kraut sprudel", only to find the sweet pie crust was filled with "the most awful mixture" of hot, boiled cabbage.

Observant Hungarian Jews would make the dough with oil and serve them for Simchat Torah and Purim, to match the customary drink imbibed at these celebrations.

Gallery

Relation to the @ symbol in Hebrew 
In Hebrew colloquial speech, the symbol @ in email addresses is called "shtrudel" (Hebrew: שטרודל), in reference to the spiral form of strudel. The official Hebrew word for the @ symbol also takes its name from strudel: "keruchith" (Hebrew: כרוכית), which refers to the @ symbol, is the Hebrew word for the strudel pastry (as opposed to the German loan word used in colloquial speech).

References

Jewish American cuisine
Ashkenazi Jewish cuisine
Austrian cuisine
Austrian pastries
Croatian cuisine
Czech cuisine
German cuisine
Hungarian desserts
Israeli cuisine
Jewish baked goods
Romanian cuisine
Slovak cuisine
Slovenian desserts
Italian cuisine
French cuisine
Purim foods